Susanne Rode-Breymann (born 29 May 1958 in Hamburg) is a German musicologist and since 2010 the president of the Hochschule für Musik, Theater und Medien in Hanover.

Biography
Rode-Breymann studied early music and music education at the  Hamburg Conservatory and musicology, art history and literature at the University of Hamburg and received her doctorate in 1988 with a thesis on Alban Berg and Karl Kraus. She was a researcher at the University of Bayreuth (1988 to 1992) and the University of Bonn (1992 to 1996), a research fellow of the Paul Sacher Foundation in Basel in 1989 researching Anton Webern etc. From 1996 to 1999 she taught as a university lecturer at the Hochschule für Musik, Theater und Medien Hannover and was from 1999 to 2004 a professor of historical musicology at the Hochschule für Musik und Tanz Köln. She was appointed professor of historical musicology at the university in Hannover in October 2004, serving as vice president from July 2006 to July 2008. In February 2010 she was elected president of the university.

Rode-Breymann is editor and author of numerous publications in the fields of gender studies, music history, early modern, contemporary music and the music of the turn of the century.

References

External links

German musicologists
Women musicologists
Opera scholarship
German music educators
1958 births
Living people
University of Hamburg alumni
Academic staff of the University of Bayreuth
Academic staff of the University of Bonn
German music historians
Academic staff of the Hochschule für Musik, Theater und Medien Hannover
German women academics
Academic staff of the Hochschule für Musik und Tanz Köln
Women music educators
German women historians